Club Deportivo Walter Ferretti is a Nicaraguan football team who play in the Nicaraguan Premier Division. They are based in Managua.

History
The club was founded in 1984 on the initiative of Walter Ferretti Fonseca.  Its intention was to serve as the sporting wing of the Sandinista Police, and it initially competed in an institutional league for government ministries.  Later, the team moved into the Nicaraguan league system.  At that time, they competed under the name of DGPS (Dirección General de La Polícia Sandinista).  DGPS stormed through the lower levels of the Nicaraguan league system, winning the Second Division in 1985 with an undefeated record.  That lifted them to the top flight of the country, where they have competed ever since.

Late in 1988, Ferretti died in a car accident on the road to Leon.  In 1991, the club was renamed to C.D. Walter Ferretti in his honor.

The 1997–98 season saw Ferretti win its first ever title, defeating Masachapa 1–0 in the championship final.  They reached the finals again in 1999–2000, losing in extra time to Diriangén.  The next year, 2000–2001, saw them go win better and claim a second championship.  It came against Diriangén, and after two scoreless legs Ferretti won on penalties, 5–3. Ferretti made it to the finals for a third consecutive year in 2002, but was run off the pitch by Jalapa, 4–1.

The club made no serious noise again until Clausura 2008, when they reached another final, this time facing Real Estelí.  Both legs of the two-legged tie were scoreless, so the match went into extra time.  Real Estelí ended up winning on a 115th-minute goal by Elmer Mejia.  They reached the finals again in Clausura 2009, beating Diriangén on penalties before losing 3–1 on aggregate to Real Estelí.

The championship-less string finally ended in Apertura 2009.  Ferretti was the dominant team in Nicaragua that year, topping the table in the first and second phases to reach the championship finals.  Real Estelí won the first leg 1–0, and scored first in the second leg to build a 2–0 aggregate lead.  Then Ferretti unleashed a torrent of goals, rallying to win the match 4–1 and the tie 4–2.

Ferretti's surge continued into the Clausura 2010, as they reached the finals again, only to lose 1–1 on away goals to Real Estelí.  The two met again that May for the Grand Final to determine the 2009–2010 champion; Real Estelí won once again on away goals.

The next year, 2010–2011, saw Ferretti win the Apertura 2–2 on away goals against Diriangén.  However, their quest to be grand champions came up short a second year in a row; they lost the Clausura final 3–2 to Real Estelí, and were beaten on penalties by the same team in the Grand Final.

Real Estelí's hold on Ferretti continued, as the Nicaraguan power beat them in the Apertura 2011, Apertura 2012, Clausura 2013 (that match was called early due to crowd trouble in the Ferretti stands) and Apertura 2013.  The curse was finally lifted in the 2014 Apertura, when Ferretti prevailed 1–0 on aggregate to hoist their first crown since Apertura 2011.  Then, in the Grand Final, Ferretti finally ended Real Estelí's string of eight consecutive Nicaraguan championships with a 2–1 aggregate win.

Real Estelí came back to win the next two titles, and beat Ferretti in the 2016 Clausura and the 2017 Clausura.  However, Ferretti rallied for a fourth crown in 2017–2018, beating Managua 1–1 in the Apertura.

Logo

Achievements

Achievements
 Primera División de Nicaragua and predecessors 
 Champions (4) : 1998, 2001, 2015, 2017

 Copa de Nicaragua and predecessors
 Champions (1) : Copa de Nicaragua 2021

Friendly

I Copa UCEM : 1
  (1) – :: 2013

Records

Record versus other nations' clubs
 As of 2018-12-17
The Concacaf opponents below = Official tournament results: 
(Plus a sampling of other results)

 Henry Huesito Urbina (108 goals)

Current squad

List of Coaches

  Salvador Dubois (1987)
  Roy Posas (1996)
  Carlos "Chicharrón" Aguilar (1998–1999) 
  Alberto Vásquez (2001–2003)
  Edison Oquendo (2002)
  Omar Zambrana (2004–2005)
  Carlos "Chicharrón" Aguilar (2007)
  Róger "Pinocho" Rodriguez (2007–2008)
  Omar Zambrana (2008 – September 2009)
  Rafael "Paciencia" Núñez (January 2009 – April 2009)
  José Valladares (August 2009 – August 2011)
  Henry "Huesito" Urbina (August 2011 – March 2013)
  Luis Gaucho Diaz (March 2013 – June 2013)
  Florencio Leiva (June 2013 – May 2014)
  Flavio Da Silva (June 2014 – September 2015)
  Marvin Solano (September 2015 – December 2015)
  José Valladares (December 2015 – August 2016)
  Flavio Da Silva (August 2016 – June 2018)
  Henry "Huesito" Urbina (July 2018– February 2022)
  Luis Gonzales (February 2022  - Present)

References

External links
 

Football clubs in Nicaragua
Deportivo Walter Ferretti
1987 establishments in Nicaragua
Association football clubs established in 1987